Ian Smith (born 13 September 1988) is an English stand-up comedian and actor, best known for his role on the BBC's The Ark and co-presenter on Dave's The Magic Sponge.

Career
Smith started his acting career with appearances in all six episodes of Popatron, a sitcom produced by Charlie Brooker's Zeppotron for BBC Two as part of its BBC Switch brand.

Alongside fellow comedian Rob Beckett and former footballer Jimmy Bullard, Smith hosts UK television channel Dave's comedy-football podcast "The Magic Sponge" - an irreverent look at the lives of professional footballers.

His largest role to date came in BBC One's 2015 TV film The Ark, starring as Ham, the son of David Threlfall's Noah.

Filmography
Siblings (2016) – Pizza Guy
The Ark (2015) – Ham
Give Out Girls (2014) – Joe
The Syndicate (2012) – Wayne
Popatron (2010) – Sam

References

External links

1988 births
Living people
English male comedians
English male actors